Goodwood railway station is a closed railway station on the North Coast railway line, Queensland. The Goodwood railway station building was donated to Hervey Bay museum on Zephyr Street after the station itself closed. There is nothing of the station left.

References

Disused railway stations in Queensland
North Coast railway line, Queensland
Bundaberg Region